Richard J. Cessar (December 1, 1928 – October 11, 2022) was an American Republican politician who was a member of the Pennsylvania House of Representatives.

Cessar died from heart failure in McCandless, Pennsylvania, on October 11, 2022, at the age of 93.

References

1928 births
2022 deaths
Republican Party members of the Pennsylvania House of Representatives
People from Etna, Pennsylvania